Fog bank may refer to:
Fog, water droplets suspended in air, especially when localized
FOGBANK, a code name given to a material used in nuclear weapons